The 2019–20 California Baptist Lancers men's basketball team represented California Baptist University in the 2019–20 NCAA Division I men's basketball season. The Lancers, led by seventh-year head coach Rick Croy, played their home games at the CBU Events Center in Riverside, California as members of the Western Athletic Conference. They finished the season 21–10, 10–6 in WAC play to finish in second place.

The season marked CBU's second year of a four-year transition period from Division II to Division I. As a result, the Lancers were not eligible for NCAA postseason play and could not participate in the WAC tournament. They were eligible to play in the CIT or CBI, if invited. However, all postseason play was cancelled due to they COVID-19 pandemic.

Previous season
The Lancers finished the 2018–19 season 16–15, 7–9 in WAC play to finish in a tie for fifth place. They were ineligible to participate in the WAC tournament due to their transition from Division II to Division I. They received an invite to the College Basketball Invitational, where they lost to Loyola Marymount in the first round.

Roster

Schedule and results

|-
!colspan=12 style=| Regular season

|-

Source

References

California Baptist Lancers men's basketball seasons
California Baptist Lancers
California Baptist Lancers men's basketball
California Baptist Lancers men's basketball